This is a list of formations of the Lithuanian Army in September 1939. On 16 September 1939, the Lithuanian government decided to partially mobilize the Lithuanian Army, which began the following day. At the very start of World War II in Europe on September 1, Lithuanian Army had a total of 22,508 serving in its ranks.

Infantry Divisions

Infantry Regiments

Cavalry Regiments

Artillery Regiments

Combat Support

Combat Service Support

Training establishments

References

Sources 
 
 
 

 1939
Lithuanian Army 1939